The tenth season of American Idol premiered on January 19, 2011, and concluded on May 25, 2011, on the Fox television network. The show underwent a multitude of changes from the ninth season, including the return of Nigel Lythgoe as the executive producer. Randy Jackson returned as judge for his tenth season while Jennifer Lopez and Steven Tyler joined the judging panel following the departures of Simon Cowell, Kara DioGuardi and Ellen DeGeneres.

Interscope Records, which is part of Universal Music Group, replaced Sony Music Entertainment as Idols official partner record label. Interscope's Chairman Jimmy Iovine, a songwriter and producer, was named as the in-house mentor to work with the contestants on a weekly basis. He was supported by associated producers Rodney Jerkins, Alex da Kid, Tricky Stewart, Don Was, will.i.am, and Timbaland, who all helped the contestants tailor their song choices to their chosen genre of performance, while also producing arrangements for the contestants and offering original material to be performed. Ray Chew replaced Rickey Minor as the show's musical director and leader of Idols live band.

Programming changes affecting viewership, included a revision in the days of broadcast from Tuesdays and Wednesdays to Wednesdays and Thursdays. The show also opened up an option for viewers to cast their votes online through Facebook, allowing 50 votes per account. Specific changes in the competition itself included extending extra rounds (such as the Las Vegas show) and a final solo round, while also returning the judges' wild card choices. The show additionally lowered the age of eligibility to 15 years. More contestants made it to Hollywood in the tenth season than in previous seasons.

On May 25, 2011, after 122.4 million votes were cast for the finale (and nearly 750 million votes for the seasonal total), Scotty McCreery was crowned the winner of the tenth season of American Idol, making him the youngest male winner at 17 years and seven months old, and the second youngest winner ever behind sixth season winner Jordin Sparks. The tenth season was the first season where 11 contestants went on tour instead of 10. Nine contestants from this season were signed to record labels. The signed artists are Scotty McCreery, Lauren Alaina, Haley Reinhart, James Durbin, Casey Abrams, Stefano Langone, Pia Toscano, Naima Adedapo, and Jimmie Allen.

Changes
Simon Cowell, who had been a judge since the first episode of the first season, announced on January 11, 2010, that he would not be returning as a judge for this season in order to focus on launching the American version of his hit British singing competition The X Factor. Ellen DeGeneres officially announced her departure on July 29, 2010, after judging for only one season, because she felt the show was not the "right fit" for her. Kara DioGuardi then announced on September 3, 2010, that she would also not return this season. On September 22, 2010, it was announced that Jennifer Lopez and Steven Tyler would join the judging panel.

There were a number of other major changes in season ten, from the judges to the format of the show itself including the opening intro, which used the "Hall of Idols". Nigel Lythgoe returned as the executive producer, and Ray Chew has been hired as the show's new musical director, replacing Rickey Minor, who left the show along with vocal coach Dorian Holley to become the musical director of The Tonight Show with Jay Leno. Peisha McPhee, mother of season 5's runner-up Katharine McPhee, joined as one of the vocal coaches. In this season, online voting was also offered for the first time for fans with Facebook accounts; up to 50 votes may be cast.

The tenth season also saw a return to the process of singers singing two songs each on performance nights starting earlier in the season, and three songs each starting on Top 3 night.

New rounds
Extra rounds were added in the Hollywood phase of the competition which would narrow the contestants down to 60 finalists. Those who advanced were then taken to Las Vegas in an extra round where they were asked to perform a song from the Beatles, and then a further solo round in Los Angeles. It was initially plan to reduce the contestants down to 20 by the end of the Hollywood rounds, however, 24 contestants were chosen instead for the semifinal, and they would perform in two groups of 12 in a semi-final sudden death round where they faced the public vote to determine the top five males and females to form the first 10 finalists. The judges were given three wild card picks, bringing the total number of finalists to 13.

Lythgoe had previously suggested significant format changes that would replace the following semifinal, with contestants having "to make the best music video, to promote themselves, and to work with a band and dancers for an awards show-style performance." However, the plans were shelved.  Despite previous reports that Idol producers had axed the weekly music theme, the themes remained.

Partnership with Universal Music
At the end of the ninth season, their affiliation with Sony Music Entertainment has ended and was replaced with Universal Music Group, meaning that the winner would now be signed to Interscope Records. Interscope's sister labels, A&M Records and Geffen Records, would also be involved in promoting and distributing the albums of the show's finalists. Chairman of the Interscope-Geffen-A&M label group, Jimmy Iovine, worked directly with contestants this season as the in-house mentor. Additionally, a team of Universal Music-associated producers and songwriters, such as Rodney "Darkchild" Jerkins, Timbaland and Alex da Kid, also worked alongside the contestants to help them take on original arrangement and material.  Some suggested changes, such as allowing the finalists to release music while the season is still in progress rather than waiting to record an album,  were not implemented, although music were released somewhat earlier than previous seasons.

Regional auditions
The judges were Steven Tyler, Jennifer Lopez, and Randy Jackson.

This is the first season in which the contestant age minimum was reduced to 15 years old. The maximum age, however, still remained 28.

Auditions were held in the following cities:

Note 1: Actual number not announced on the show but this number is based on the number of names listed on americanidol.com website and may not be the actual total.

In addition to the above cities, for the first time contestants were allowed to audition online via Myspace / Facebook / Twitter. To audition, they were required to upload a 40-second audition clip of them singing a pre-approved song. The internet auditioners, including Karen Rodriguez, were called back to Los Angeles to audition in front of the judges.

Hollywood week
The Hollywood week phase of the competition was held in the Pasadena Civic Center. There were a record-number 327 contestants in the first round, which lasted over two days, exceeding the second season's record of 234. The contestants emerged in groups of ten and each performed individually a cappella. After the whole group had finished their performances, those who failed were cut immediately. 168 advanced to the next round, where the contestants performed in groups; out of the 168, only 100 advanced to the next round. In the next round, the contestants performed solo, accompanied by a band or an instrument. The contestants were then separated into four rooms, with two of the four rooms containing eliminated contestants and the other two containing contestants who made it into the next round. Only 61 of the 100 remaining advanced.

This year, due to the large number of contestants, two more rounds were added. The 61 remaining contestants proceeded to Las Vegas where they performed songs from the Beatles as duos and trios in the Love theater at The Mirage for this newly added 'Las Vegas' round. After that, 41 advanced to the final "Sing For Your Life" round back in Los Angeles. In that round, each contestant performed a song of their own choosing at Howard Hughes' Spruce Goose aircraft hangar. The Top 24 were then selected from the remaining 41 for the semifinals.

Semi-finalists
The following are semi-finalists who failed to reach the finals.

Color key:

Semi-finals
The semi-final round began on Tuesday, March 1, 2011. Below are the two semi-final groups (males and females) with contestants listed in their performance order. The top five males and top five females, along with the three wild card choices by the judges, advanced to the finals. The males started the semifinal round, and the females continued on following night's episode, and the contestants perform songs of their choice.

Wild Card round
Following those ten singers advancing on Thursday, March 3, six of the remaining 14 semi-finalists were selected by the judges to compete in the Wild Card round. The Wild Card round immediately began, following the announcement of the ten finalists. Following another performance by each Wild Card contender, the judges then selected three contestants to advance to the final group of 13.

Finalists

Scotty McCreery (born October 9, 1993) is from Garner, North Carolina, and was 17 years old at the time of the show. He auditioned in Milwaukee, Wisconsin, with Josh Turner's "Your Man" and Travis Tritt's "Put Some Drive in Your Country". He reprised "Your Man" in the Hollywood rounds but forgot the words to Lee Ann Womack's "I Hope You Dance". He also performed "Get Ready" with the group "The Guaps" and became involved in the drama when Clint Jun Gamboa ousted young Jacee Badeaux from their group. For his final solo he performed Josh Turner's "Long Black Train". McCreery was announced as the winner on May 25, and was signed to 19/Interscope/Mercury Nashville. His debut album, Clear as Day, was released on October 4, 2011.

Lauren Alaina (born November 8, 1994) is from Rossville, Georgia, and 16 years old at the time of the show. She auditioned in Nashville, Tennessee, with Faith Hill's "Like We Never Loved At All" and Aerosmith's "I Don't Want to Miss a Thing" which she also reprised for the Hollywood rounds. She also performed "Unchained Melody" twice, once for the first solo in the Hollywood rounds and again for the final solo. She also performed Soul Brothers Six's "Some Kind of Wonderful" in a girl group which was notable for getting Steven Tyler to sit on the chair while they performed around him. She performed "Hello, Goodbye" for the Las Vegas' Beatles round with Scotty McCreery and Denise Jackson. Alaina was announced as the runner-up and was signed to 19/Interscope/Mercury Nashville, and her debut album, Wildflower, was released on October 11, 2011.

Haley Reinhart (born September 9, 1990) is from Wheeling, Illinois, and 20 years old at the time of the show. She originally auditioned in Chicago in the ninth season and did not advance to the Hollywood round. She auditioned in Milwaukee, Wisconsin, with The Beatles' "Oh! Darling". She performed Corinne Bailey Rae's "Breathless" in the first solo round. In the group round she forgot her words of the song but still made it through, and in the Hollywood rounds she performed Billie Holiday's "God Bless the Child". In the Las Vegas group round, she performed The Beatles' "The Long and Winding Road" with Naima Adedapo and Jacob Lusk. For her final solo she performed The Shirelles' song "Baby It's You". Reinhart was eliminated on May 19, coming in 3rd place. Reinhart was signed to Interscope Records after the show. Her first single, "Free", was released on March 20, 2012, and her debut album, Listen Up!, was released on May 22.

James Durbin (born January 6, 1989) is from Santa Cruz, California, and 22 years old at the time of the show. He originally auditioned in the eighth season and was not selected. He auditioned in San Francisco, California, with Muddy Waters's "You Shook Me" and Aerosmith's "Dream On". He performed The Beatles' "Oh! Darling" for his solo in the Hollywood round, Queen's "Somebody to Love" with the group "Deep Vees" in the group round and Sam Cooke's "A Change Is Gonna Come" for his final solo. He was the lead singer with a band The Hollywood Scars prior to Idol. He has Tourette and Asperger's syndromes. Durbin was eliminated on May 12, coming in 4th place.  He was signed to Wind-up Records in with an album, Memories of a Beautiful Disaster released on November 21, 2011.

Jacob Lusk (born June 23, 1987) is from Compton, California, and 23 years old at the time of the show. Before American Idol, he worked as a spa concierge. He auditioned in Los Angeles, California. He was first shown in the group stage of the competition where he performed with fellow finalist Naima Adedapo, Vegas contestant Sophia Shorai, and Matthew Nuss, and Da'Quela Payne. Randy Jackson considered his performance of Billie Holiday's "God Bless the Child" during the Hollywood rounds the best ever seen on Idol. He also performed The Temptations' "Get Ready" with Naima Adedapo in the group "Ebony, Ivory, and Every", and Leon Russell's "A Song for You" for his final solo. In the Top 24 round, he earned standing ovation for his performance of "A House Is Not a Home" by Luther Vandross. After singing "No Air" by Jordin Sparks and Chris Brown and "Love Hurts" by The Everly Brothers, Lusk was eliminated on May 5, coming in 5th place. Lusk would go on to front the gospel-soul trio Gabriels.

Casey Abrams (born February 12, 1991) is from Idyllwild, California, and 20 years old at the time of show. He auditioned in Austin, Texas, with Ray Charles' "I Don't Need No Doctor". He impressed the judges with his performance of "Georgia on My Mind" in Hollywood week. He also performed Ella Fitzgerald's "Lullaby of Birdland", The Temptations' "Get Ready" with the group "Night Owls" in the Hollywood rounds, "A Hard Day's Night" with Chris Medina in the Las Vegas's Beatles round, and Kansas Joe McCoy's "Why Don't You Do Right?" for his final solo. He played the double bass and melodica on the show. He suffers from ulcerative colitis which resulted in him missing the Top 13 result show. He got the one judges' save of the season on the Top 11 show. Abrams was eliminated on April 28, coming in 6th place. Abrams was signed to Concord Music Group after the show.

Stefano Langone (born February 27, 1989) is from Kent, Washington, and 22 years old at the time of the show. He auditioned in San Francisco, California, with Marvin Gaye's "I Heard It Through the Grapevine". He performed Stevie Wonder's "Sir Duke" in the Hollywood week, "Get Back" for the Las Vegas round with James Durbin, and his own composition "Come Home" for his final solo. He survived a near-fatal car accident in 2009 being hit by a drunk driver. Langone was chosen by the judges as one of the Wild Cards to join the Top 13 finalists. Langone was eliminated on April 21, coming in 7th place. Langone was signed to Hollywood Records after the show. He released his debut single "I'm on a Roll" featuring New Boyz and Rock Mafia on April 24, 2012.

Paul McDonald (born August 29, 1984) is from Huntsville, Alabama, and 26 years old at the time of the show. He auditioned in Nashville, Tennessee, with Rod Stewart's "Maggie May". Prior to Idol, he was the lead singer of the band Hightide Blues formed in 2005 and renamed The Grand Magnolias in 2010. He performed Fleetwood Mac's "Landslide" and his own composition "American Dreams" for his final solo. McDonald was eliminated on April 14, coming in 8th place.

Pia Toscano (born October 14, 1988) is from Howard Beach, New York, and 22 years old at the time of the show. She had auditioned for Idol four times before and made it through Hollywood in the sixth season and did not continue further. She auditioned in Jersey City, New Jersey, and was a make-up artist. She sang the national anthem at a Mets game. Pia Toscano and Karen Rodriguez get together to duet The Beatles' "Can't Buy Me Love" on Las Vegas, they also went to New York's LaGuardia Arts School together. She also performed Bruno Mars's "Grenade" for the group round in Hollywood and Alicia Keys's "Doesn't Mean Anything" for her final solo. Toscano was eliminated on April 7, coming in 9th place. Toscano was signed to Interscope Records after the show, releasing her debut single "This Time" on July 11, 2011. Pia auditioned five times.

Naima Adedapo (born October 5, 1984) is from Milwaukee, Wisconsin, and 26 years old at the time of the show. She auditioned in Milwaukee, Wisconsin, with Donny Hathaway's version of "For All We Know". She was doing janitorial duties at the Summerfest in Milwaukee before she auditioned on Idol. She performed Beatles' "The Long and Winding Road" together with Jacob Lusk and Haley Reinhart during the Las Vegas round, and Corinne Bailey Rae's "Put Your Records On" for her final solo. Adedapo was chosen by the judges to join the competition during the Wild Card round. Adedapo was eliminated on March 31, coming in 10th with Thia Megia.

Thia Megia (born January 30, 1995) is from Mountain House, San Joaquin County, California, and 16 years old at the time of the show. She auditioned in Milwaukee, Wisconsin, with Adele's "Chasing Pavements" and she turned 16 at the time of the show. Before her stint on American Idol, she previously competed on the fourth season of America's Got Talent, making it to the quarterfinals. She also participated in the YouTube edition of "We Are the World" along with 56 other YouTube artists, including American Idol eleventh season runner-up Jessica Sanchez. She performed "Summertime" from Porgy and Bess and Louis Armstrong's "What a Wonderful World" in the Hollywood rounds, "Here Comes the Sun" for the Las Vegas round with Melinda Ademi, and Secret Garden's "You Raise Me Up" for her final solo. At 16 years and 1-month, she was the youngest contestant to reach the finals. Megia was eliminated on March 31, coming in a joint 10th place with Naima Adedapo.

Karen Rodriguez (born March 22, 1989) is from New York City and 21 years old at the time of show. She turned 22 years old soon after she got voted off. She was one of the Myspace auditioners and then auditioned in front of the judges in Los Angeles, California, with Whitney Houston's "You Give Good Love". She performed Jennifer Lopez's "If You Had My Love", Bruno Mars's "Just the Way You Are" with Jovany Baretto in the group "Spanglish" for the Hollywood rounds, and Selena's "No me queda más" in the final round. She had previously appeared in the fifth season of a Puerto Rican talent show Objetivo Fama. Rodriguez was eliminated on March 17, coming in 12th place.

Ashthon Jones (born February 27, 1986) is from Goodlettsville, Tennessee, and 24 years old when she auditioned and turned 25 at the time of show. She auditioned in Nashville, Tennessee. She sang "And I Am Telling You I'm Not Going" from Dreamgirls, Blu Cantrell's Hit 'Em Up Style (Oops!) with the group "The Hits" in the Hollywood rounds and Whitney Houston's "I Wanna Dance with Somebody" for her final solo. Jones was chosen by the judges as one of the Wild Card finalists. She was eliminated on March 10, coming in 13th place.

Finals
This is the first season in which there were 12 weeks of the finals and the for the first season since season eight, there were 13 finalists as contrast to 12 (with 11 weeks of finals) as seen in the previous seasons; unlike the former, the first week is a single elimination, rather than double elimination (which resulted in that season having only 11 weeks). The top 13 performance show was pre-recorded, but subsequent shows were broadcast live. Seventh season winner David Cook recorded "Don't You (Forget About Me)" as the song played during the contestant's montage. The finals venue was same stage as used in the Semi-Finals.

Color key:

Top 13 – Their Personal Idols

Top 12 – Year They Were Born

Top 11 (first week) – Motown
Marc Anthony served as the guest mentor this week, though was not explicitly announced during the show.

Top 11 (second week) – Elton John

Top 9 – Rock & Roll Hall of Fame
Mentors: will.i.am & Russell Brand

Top 8 – Songs from the Movies
will.i.am and Rob Reiner served as guest mentors for this week.

Top 7 – Songs from the 21st century

Top 6 – Carole King
Each contestant sang one solo song composed by Carole King, and one duet with a fellow contestant. Babyface served as the guest mentor for this week. Unlike the previous result shows, Seacrest forego revealing the contestants in bottom three and insisted that the results are announced in "random order" (i.e. not in particular order of rank or results). The callout order of the first three contestants declaring safe were Reinhart, Durbin, Alaina, leaving Abrams, Lusk and McCreery the last three contestants remaining. After Seacrest reminded again that the callout order are random, he announced that Abrams got the fewest votes was eliminated, and claimed that the other two were not necessarily among the bottom three vote-getters that week. The claim was later confirmed on next week's result show via his Twitter revealing that McCreery had never been in the bottom two.

Top 5 – Songs from Now & Then
The Top 5 performed two songs, one from the new millennium and a second song from the 1960s. Sheryl Crow served as the guest mentor this week.

Top 4 – Songs That Inspire / Leiber & Stoller Songbook
Lady Gaga served as this week's guest mentor.

Top 3 – Contestant's Choice / Jimmy Iovine's Choice / Judges' Choice
The Top 3 contestants performed three songs, each chosen by themselves, one from their mentor Iovine, and one from the judges. Beyoncé served as the guest mentor for this week.

Top 2 – Favorite Performance / Personal Idol's Choice / Winner's Single
Alaina damaged her vocal cords while rehearsing for the finale, but she was treated and cleared to continue in the competition.

Breaking the tradition from the past seasons, the judges did not offer their critiques of the performances until after both contestants had sung both of their opening songs, and then the critiques were delivered to both contestants at the same time. Also, the schedule for the two-part finale was moved back to its previous schedule of Tuesday and Wednesday.

Elimination chart
Color key:

Results show performances

Controversies

Gender voting bias and elimination of Pia Toscano
The first five contestants eliminated from the finals were all female contestants, and this early elimination of female contestants led to criticism of bias against women. Idol producer Ken Warwick said, "It's no secret that most reality shows are female driven, either by moms or by young girls. It does mean we're going to get a heftier amount of female votes and it's always bent towards the boys, obviously, we are very much aware that the voting can be skewed towards the boys." The voting also provoked considerable criticism after the last of these five female contestants, Pia Toscano, a presumed front-runner, was surprisingly eliminated in ninth place. In response to criticism, the producers considered tweaking the voting format for the next season.

Judges critique
Online critics from major news sources like Brian Mansfield of USA Today, Dalton Ross of Entertainment Weekly, Andrea Reiher of Zap2it, and Tom Gliatto of People criticized the judges for being too nice, not being honest enough, offering hardly any constructive criticism towards the contestants, and for not giving any guidance and direction for the viewers/voters in terms of why they should or should not be voting for someone. Executive producer Ken Warwick responded to these criticisms and said, "The truth of the matter is these kids are very good and I wouldn't influence the judges to say anything they don't absolutely believe ... They are trying to keep things on the straight and narrow. What they feel are genuine feelings, that's all I can ask them to do." Nigel Lythgoe, another executive producer, also responded to these criticisms on his Twitter and answered, "IT IS NOT ABOUT THE JUDGES OPINION IT'S ABOUT YOURS!! U R NOT SHEEP!" In October 2011, however, judge Jennifer Lopez revealed that all three judges would be tougher on the contestants in the eleventh season.

Lee DeWyze finale involvement
Many fans of the ninth season winner, Lee DeWyze, were upset that he did not take part in the season ten finale like he was rumored to. Executive producer Nigel Lythgoe responded on his Twitter that he asked DeWyze to take part in the finale, but he declined, "I was so upset Lee DeWyze wouldn't present the winners trophy to Scotty," he wrote. "Especially as he'd been on the show this Season. I guess he was shy." However, DeWyze said that he was actually not asked to take part in the finale, "Just for the record… I was not asked to be involved in the Finale. It wasn't until about 2 minutes before they announced that Nigel had approached me and asked if he could "borrow" me for a second. I didn't feel a last second jump on stage was appropriate. It was Scotty's moment. I appreciate American Idol, and the opportunity it has given me. And the people who have made that show possible. I am not angry, or bitter etc. It was an amazing Finale, and I would have loved to be a part of it. I just wasn't asked." DeWyze was seen in the audience towards the end of the show.

U.S. Nielsen ratings
American Idol ended the 2010–2011 television season as the number one and number two show in Total Viewers, and the number one and number three show in Adults 18–49.  The Wednesday performance shows earned an average of 25.864 million viewers and an 8.8/24 rating in the Adults 18–49 demographic, while the Thursday results show earned an average of 23.798 million viewers and a 7.7/22 rating in the Adults 18–49 demographic.  The show's success helped Fox network achieve the longest winning streak in broadcast history of seven consecutive season in the Adult 18–49 demo.

See also
 American Idols LIVE! Tour 2011

References

External links

American Idol seasons
2011 American television seasons